Electronic data can stand for 
data in general that is exchanged via electronic communication lines
digital data in particular
Data (computing), i.e. computer-processable data as opposed to executable code